Indonesia participated at the 2018 Summer Youth Olympics in Buenos Aires, Argentina from 6 October to 18 October 2018.

Competitors

Medals
Medals awarded to participants of mixed-NOC (Combined) teams are represented in italics. These medals are not counted towards the individual NOC medal tally.

Athletics

Badminton

Indonesia qualified one player based on the Badminton Junior World Rankings.  A second player also qualified, but the quota was declined Indonesia later gained another girls' spot after reallocation. 

Team

Basketball

Indonesia qualified a girls' team based on the U18 3x3 National Federation Ranking.

 Girls' tournament – 1 team of 4 athletes

Shoot-out contest

Beach volleyball

Indonesia qualified one team based on its performance at the 2018 Asian U19 Championship.

 Boys' tournament – 1 team of 2 athletes

Golf

Individual

Team

Shooting

Individual

Team

Swimming

Weightlifting

Indonesia qualified two lifters (one boy and one girl) based on its performance at the 2017 World Championships.

References

2018 in Indonesian sport
Nations at the 2018 Summer Youth Olympics
Indonesia at the Youth Olympics